Tom Barney is an American bass guitarist.

Career 
Barney first came to prominence in the late 1970s, when he appeared on different jazz albums by Turk Mauro and Walter Davis Jr., following to appear on records by such artists as Chaka Khan, Judy Collins, Miles Davis, Bob Mintzer, Terumasa Hino, Jane Fonda, Dizzy Gillespie and Lonnie Liston Smith in the early 80s. On December 15, 1984 he appeared on Saturday Night Live with The Honeydrippers. Some of these opportunities led him to play on albums by Mike Stern, Mitchel Forman, Tania Maria, Grover Washington Jr., Lillo Thomas, Ornella Vanoni, Teddy Pendergrass, Desiree Coleman, Regina Belle and Michael Kamen's Lethal Weapon 2 soundtrack. In 1989, along with Philippe Saisse, Omar Hakim, Don Alias and Hiram Bullock he was the constant bass player for saxophonist David Sanborn's Sunday Night/Night Music show.

In the 90s he played on records by Toshinobu Kubota, James Newton Howard, Alex Foster, Ronnie Cuber, Pierce Turner, Doc Powell, Bernadette Peters, Angelique Kidjo as well as Whitney Houston, Mary J. Blige, Lauryn Hill, Jennifer Lopez, Rosie O'Donnell and on Santana's Grammy-Award-winning album Supernatural. He was also a member of Steely Dan and played at the Copenhagen Jazz Festival as part of the David Sanborn Band in 1991. Along with Herbie Hancock, Vanessa L. Williams, Pat Metheny, Bruce Hornsby, Dee Dee Bridgewater, John McLaughlin and others, he appeared on the 1994 VHS release of The Carnegie Hall Jazz Band.

Since 2000 Barney has appeared on records by Anastacia, Rod Stewart, Joss Stone, Trina Broussard, Toby Lightman as well as Elbow Bones & the Racketeers. From 2008-2010 he was the constant bass player of the Las Vegas musical The Showgirl Must Go On starring Bette Midler and is the current bass player of the musical The Lion King in New York City.

Discography

With Lonnie Liston Smith
Silhouettes (Doctor Jazz, 1984)

References 

American bass guitarists
American male bass guitarists
Living people
Year of birth missing (living people)
Saturday Night Live Band members